42 Commando (42 Cdo) (pronounced as Four-Two Commando) is a subordinate unit within the Royal Marines 3 Commando Brigade. Based at Bickleigh Barracks near Plymouth, personnel regularly deploy outside the United Kingdom on operations or training.  All Royal Marines personnel will have completed the Commando course at the Commando Training Centre (CTCRM) at Lympstone in Devon, entitling them to wear the green beret, with most attached personnel having completed the All Arms Commando Course.

History

Second World War
Early Commando units were all from the British Army, but by February 1942, the Royal Marines were asked to organise Commando units of their own, and 6,000 men volunteered.

No. 42 (Royal Marine) Commando was raised in August 1943, under the command of Lieutenant Colonel R C de M. Leathes from the 1st Royal Marine Battalion, as part of the expansion of the commandos.
They were assigned to the 3rd Special Service Brigade and served in India and Burma in 1943–45, including operations in the Arakan and Assam. It took part in the third Arakan campaign
and carried out a series of amphibious landings down the Burmese coastline. Including the landings at Myebon and the Battle of Hill 170. It then returned to India to prepare for Operation Zipper the invasion of British Malaya. The war ended before the operation began and the commando was diverted to reoccupy Hong Kong.

Post-Second World War

Following the Second World War 1st, 2nd and 4th commando brigades disbanded leaving only one brigade – the 3rd (40(RM), 42(RM) and 45(RM)). The Commando was involved in operations during the confrontation with Indonesia (Borneo). It was during this tour that the famous Limbang raid was conducted by Lima Company.

Return to UK
After the return to the UK, the Commando was deployed to Northern Ireland,  the New Hebrides in 1980 and exercised regularly overseas. More recently the Commando has seen operational service in South Georgia, Montserrat in 1995, Iraq and Afghanistan.

Falklands Conflict
In 1982, following the Argentine invasion of the Falkland Islands, the Commando deployed on Operation Corporate. On 21 May the Commando were Brigade reserve at San Carlos under Lt. Col. Nick Vaux RM. The unit was deployed to seize Mount Kent in a night move by helicopter. By 4 June the unit had moved forward, mostly under cover of darkness, to positions west of high ground overlooking Port Stanley and the last Argentine stronghold.

After days of probing reconnaissance, a Brigade assault took place on the night of 11/12 June in which the Commando's task was to secure Mount Harriet on the Brigade right flank. By moonlight and in freezing temperatures, 42 Commando moved undetected through enemy minefields in a  right-flanking movement to surprise the enemy in their rear. Consecutive assaults by "K" and "L" Companies followed, up steep slopes onto company positions. Against strong resistance and continuous artillery bombardment, the Marines prevailed. By first light more than 30 enemy had been killed and over 300 prisoners taken as 42 Commando consolidated on Mount Harriet. 42 Commando suffered two fatalities themselves – one on Mount Harriet and one on Wall Mountain.  For the bravery shown in the attack on Mount Harriet, 42 Commando was awarded one DSO, one Military Cross, four Military Medals and eight men were Mentioned in Dispatches.

21st Century

The new millennium saw the Commando deploy on Operation Telic 1 for the invasion of Iraq in 2003 where they launched a helicopter assault on the Al-Faw Peninsula to support 40 Commando.  The unit returned from Operation Herrick in Afghanistan on 16 April 2009, where it served as the Regional Battle Group (South).  In May 2013, 42 Commando took over from 45 Commando as the lead Commando task group and deployed as part of the COUGAR 13 Response Force Task Group exercising in Albania and the Middle East.  

In early July 2019, personnel from 42 Commando deployed by air to Gibraltar, in order to support the Gibraltar Government's detention of the Panama-flagged crude oil tanker Grace 1. The vessel was suspected of carrying oil to a Syrian refinery, in contravention of European Union sanctions against Syria.  In March 2020, personnel of the unit worked with the Peacekeeping Company of the Belarusian 103rd Guards Airborne Brigade at the Losvido Training Areas during the two-week Exercise Winter Partisan, which was the first time Armed Forces of Belarus have provided training to any nation.

Role
42 Commando is a Very High Readiness commando force capable of delivering special operations with a specific expertise in maritime operations including: high threat capacity-building and training of overseas partnered forces; Ships Force Protection Teams; training to indigenous forces; maritime interdiction and boarding operations; UK resilience and support to the Queen Elizabeth Class Carriers.

Organisation 
Prior to April 2017, the structure of 42 Commando followed the Commando 21 model with four rifle companies:

 J (Juliet) company.
 K (Kilo) company.
 L (Lima) company.
 M (Mike) company.

Following the commando's re-role in 2018 the companies specialised as follows:

 J company - board and search specialists (role transferred from 43 Commando under project Sykes).
 K company - Support, Augment, Liaise and Train (SALT) either other UK units, Allied forces, or front-line operations
 L company - Joint Personnel Recovery, rescuing aircrew or fellow marines/soldiers who are isolated, missing, detained or captured in an operational environment, in particular fliers aboard .
 M company - force protection teams to RN and RFA ships passing through high threat areas around the globe

In 2021 the unit comprised 6 companies.

Commanders
Commanders have included:
1948–1950 Lt. Col. Ian Riches
1963–1965 Lt. Col. Ian Gourlay
1965–1966 Lt. Col. Peter Whiteley
1970–1972 Lt. Col. John Richards
1972–1973 Lt. Col. Jeremy Moore
Oct 75 – Apr 78 Lt Col TJM Wilson RM
Apr 78 – Jun 80 Lt Col Henry Beverley OBE RM
Jun 80 – Dec 81 Lt Col CHC Howgill RM
Dec 81 – May 83 Lt Col Nick Vaux DSO RM
May 83 – Dec 84 Lt Col PT Stevenson MBE RM
Dec 84 – Oct 86 Lt Col Van Der Horst RM
Oct 86 – Jun 88 Lt Col RS Tailyour RM
Jun 88 – Jul 90 Lt Col David Pennefather RM
Jul 90 – Jul 92 Lt Col NM Robinson RM
Jul 92 – May 94 Lt Col Robert Fulton RM
May 94 – May 96 Lt Col AR Pillar RM
May 96 – May 98 Lt Col RGT Lane RM
May 98 – Dec 99 Lt Col RM Bowkett RM
Dec 99 – Apr 01 Lt Col Andy Salmon RM
Apr 01 – Nov 02 Lt Col DA Hook OBE RM
Nov 02 – Jul 04 Lt Col Buster Howes OBE RM
Jul 04 – Mar 06 Lt Col GM Salzano MBE RM
Apr 06 – Jan 08 Lt Col MJ Holmes DSO RM
Jan 08 – Oct 09 Lt Col CR Stickland OBE RM
Oct 09 – Jan 12 Lt Col EA Murchison MBE RM
Jan 12 - Jan 14 Lt Col N Sutherland MBE RM
Jan 14 - Nov 15 Lt Col Richard Cantrill OBE MC RM
Nov 15 - Dec 17 Lt Col Mark Totten MBE RM
Dec 17 - Sept 19 Lt Col Ben Halstead MBE RM
Sep 19 - Jun 21 Lt Col Doug Pennefather RM
Jun 21 - Present Lt Col James Lewis OBE RM

References
Notes

Bibliography

External links
 42 Commando
 Royal Marines History The Royal Marines a Geo History

Royal Marine formations and units
Military units and formations established in 1942
Military units and formations of the United Kingdom in the Falklands War
Military units and formations of the United Kingdom in the War in Afghanistan (2001–2021)
Commandos (United Kingdom)
1942 establishments in the United Kingdom
N